Ludwig Woltmann (born 18 February 1871 in Solingen; died 30 January 1907) was a German anthropologist, zoologist and neo-Kantian.

He studied medicine and philosophy, and obtained doctorates in the two fields from the University of Freiburg in 1896.

Ludwig Woltmann falls in the spiritual and ideological history of the 20th century with the racial theorists Arthur de Gobineau and Houston Stewart Chamberlain, in particular in terms of his racial theoretical thought. In his book Die Germanen und die Renaissance in Italien (1905), he argued that the emergence of the Renaissance in Italy was led not by the descendants of the Romans, but by the Germanic tribes who had subdued Italy during the Middle Ages. His ideas were mainly published by the journal Political-Anthropological Review (1902–1907) and in the book Political Anthropology written in 1903. This and two other of his books were published in a 1936 Otto Reche anthology.

Publications 
 1898: System of moral consciousness, with a special presentation of the ratio of the critical philosophy to Darwinism and Socialism
 1899: The Darwinian theory and socialism. A contribution to the natural history of human society
 1900: Historical materialism. Presentation and critique of the Marxist world outlook
 1900: Pilgrimage. Sketches from Palestine
 1901: The position of social democracy to religion
 1903: Political Anthropology. A study on the influence of the theory of evolution on the doctrine of the political development of peoples
 1903: Are the Goths under assumed in Italy?
 1904: Racial psychology and cultural history
 1904: The physical type of Immanuel Kant
 1905: The Germans and the Renaissance in Italy
 1905: Marxism and race theory
 1905: Recent literature on racial theory
 1906 : For the German question in the Italian Renaissance
 1906: The Germans in Spain
 1907: The Germans in France. A study on the influence of the Germanic race on the history and culture of France
 1908: Klemm and Gobineau
 1924: Youth poems

Literature 
 Wolfhard Hammer, The Life and Work of the Physician and Social Anthropologist Ludwig Woltmann. Univ. Diss, Mainz 1979.
 Jürgen Mixing, The Political Philosophy of Ludwig Woltmann. In the Field of Tension between Kantianism's Historical Materialism and Social Darwinism, Bonn 1975
 Sebastian Pella, The Social Darwinism-bred Theoretical Thinking in Ludwig Woltmann's Artwork, Political Anthropology, Bottrop 2009.

References

External links 
 
 
 

1871 births
1907 deaths
19th-century anthropologists
20th-century anthropologists
German anthropologists
German Marxists
German socialists
19th-century German zoologists
People from Solingen
Proponents of scientific racism
University of Freiburg alumni